Reni Hicks (born 7 September 1998) is an Australian rules footballer who played for the Carlton Football Club in the AFL Women's (AFLW). Hicks was drafted by Carlton with their third selection and the twenty-ninth overall in the 2017 AFL Women's draft. She made her debut in the twenty-one point win against  at Drummoyne Oval in round 2 of the 2018 season.

References

External links 

1998 births
Living people
Carlton Football Club (AFLW) players
Australian rules footballers from Victoria (Australia)